Miller House is a mansion on the Embassy Row section of Massachusetts Avenue in Washington, D.C. It has been described as "the finest surviving mansion" designed by Paul J. Pelz, the main architect of the Library of Congress.

History

The house, designed by Pelz in the Northern Renaissance style, was built in 1900-01 for Commander Frederick Augustus Miller (1842–1909). Because Miller had been a U.S. Navy officer during the U.S. Civil War the house includes a number of maritime motifs,  including the statue of a ship's cat on the ledge facing Massachusetts Avenue.

The house was sold by Miller's widow in 1913 and changed hands several times afterwards. During most of the 1920s it was owned by Washington developer Harry Wardman or his business partners. In 1923–26 it was leased to the Costa Rican and Salvadorean Legations. Like many mansions in Northwest Washington, D.C., it was then divided into apartments during the Great Depression and rented as a boarding house. In the early 1960s it was owned by Oscar Cox, who in 1940–41 had been instrumental in drafting and administering the Lend-Lease Act.

In 1984 the house's owner, Scott McLeod, started its renovation. During the works that same year, a fire destroyed many of the house's internal features. The owner decided to preserve and repair the exterior structure and to rebuild inside on a design by Richard Ridley, a local architect and author of the Washington Posts Making Space column from 1982 to 1988. The project was completed in 1986 and won a Dupont Circle Conservancy Historic Preservation Award.

In the early 21st century, the house has been managed by a condominium association under the name "Argyle House".

An integral part of the house is the former garage on 22nd Street, also built in 1900–01 and "apparently the first [automobile garage] in Washington," actually intended for an electric car. From 1986 to 2009 it was used by Olga Hirshhorn, widow of entrepreneur and philanthropist Joseph Hirshhorn, to host part of her art collection. Hirschhorn named the 500-square-foot structure her "Mouse House", in playful reference to the house's cat statue. In 2009 the contents of the "Mouse House" were displayed at the Bruce Museum of Arts and Science in Greenwich, Connecticut and then at the Patty & Jay Baker Museum of Art in Naples, Florida where they have since been donated to the permanent exhibition.

In media

In its January 2020 issue, Washingtonian included the rooftop cat sculpture as Ceramic Cat among its list of 93 "hidden gems" in Washington DC ("Off-the-Beaten-Path Things to See and Do").

Gallery

Notes

External links

Embassy Row
Residential condominiums in Washington, D.C.
Former houses in the United States
1901 establishments in Washington, D.C.